The Tribe (Plemya) is a 2014 Ukrainian crime drama film written and directed by Myroslav Slaboshpytskiy. Starring Hryhoriy Fesenko, Yana Novikova and Roza Babiy, the film is set in a boarding school for deaf teenage students, where a novice scholar is drawn into an institutional system of organized crime involving robbery and prostitution. He crosses a dangerous line when he falls for one of the girls to whom he's assigned to pimp. The film is entirely in Ukrainian Sign Language and was the first Ukrainian film to be released in many countries around the world.

The Tribe won the Nespresso Grand Prize, as well as the France 4 Visionary Award, and the Gan Foundation Support for Distribution Award in the International Critics' Week at the 2014 Cannes Film Festival.

Considered the frontrunner to represent Ukraine for the Academy Award for Best Foreign Language Film at the 87th Academy Awards, there was controversy over alleged conflict of interest during the voting process after the drama The Guide was chosen instead.

Plot
A teenage boy, Serhiy, arrives at a boarding school for the deaf. There he tries to find his place in the hierarchy of the academic community, which operates like a Gang ruled by the King of the group. Their squad participates in acts of violence, robbery, sex and prostitution. When one of the boys who helps in pimping two girls from the school gets crushed by a truck, Serhiy takes his place. He falls in love with one of the girls, Anya, whom he impregnates. Serhiy finds a purse on a train which he steals, giving the money to Anya for a makeshift abortion. Some time later, Serhiy follows one of the teachers home, knocks him unconscious, and robs him, giving the substantial sum to Anya and then raping her. One of the gangmasters prepare to send the two girls to Italy, but Serhiy ruins Anya's passport and is eventually beaten by King and his gang. Serhiy later retaliates by crushing their heads with their nightstands in their sleep.

Cast
 Hryhoriy Fesenko as Serhiy
 Yana Novikova as Anya
 Roza Babiy as Svetka
 Oleksandr Dsiadevych as Gera
 Ivan Tishko as Makar
 Oleksandr Osadchyi as King
 Oleksandr Sydelnykov as Shnyr
 Oleksandr Panivan as Woodwork Teacher
 Kyrylo Koshek as Sponsor
 Maryna Panivan as Nora
 Tetiana Radchenko as Principal
 Liudmyla Rudenko as History Teacher
 Yaroslav Biletskiy
 Sasha Rusakov
 Denys Hruba
 Dania Bykobiy
 Lenia Pisanenko

Release
The Tribe premiered at the Cannes Film Festival on 21 May 2014 in Cannes, France, where it opened in the oldest parallel section of the festival, International Critics' Week, "blowing away" critics and audiences alike, before screening at the Locarno International Film Festival as a special screening for the Jury on 12 August, the Sarajevo Film Festival as the part of the  section on 19 August, opening the Toronto International Film Festival on 9 September as part of the Discovery section,  the London Film Festival on 15 October, and the Denver International Film Festival on 15 November 2014.

Theatrical run
Prior to The Tribe'''s Cannes International Critics' Week selection, Paris-based Alpha Violet, picked up the film.

CEO of Alpha Violet Virginie Devesa, stated that it was an advantage having the piece before the film's Cannes selection, due to it allowing the company to work with the producers on the trailer and other promotional materials, with her stating, "When we first watched the film, it was such as strong emotional ‘shock’ that we wanted to share these emotions and hoped for ‘The Tribe’ to be in Cannes."

On 26 May 2014, Alpha Violet was announced as handling the international sales of The Tribe, as well as speaking to potential buyers of the piece at the Cannes Film Festival, to which sales interest were spurred on by its critical reception. Jonathan Romney of The Guardian calling the piece "the great discovery of this year's festival." Eric Kohn of IndieWIRE spoke of the film as "an unprecedented cinematic accomplishment." Wendy Ide of The Times gave it five stars adding, "It takes a film like the Ukrainian drama ‘The Tribe’to neatly encapsulate the festival’s real raison d’etre: To discover and celebrate the most exciting, daring and outstanding films made around the world." Karel Och of the Karlovy Vary International Film Festival described it as "the cinematic event of the year." Devesa stated that territories such as the United States, United Kingdom and Hong Kong are being sewn up and currently under negotiation, with her stating, "This is the first time I've had this experience as a sales agent. I hope I live it again. The film is so radical, original, that you might have expected these results, but you never know." Later it was announced that UFO Distribution had acquired the rights to distribute the film within France, Atsuko Murata's Mimosa Films were confirmed to have acquired the Japanese distribution rights to The Tribe, Amstel Film picked up the distribution rights in the Netherlands and film rights in Denmark were confirmed to have been acquired by Ost For Paradis.

On 2 July 2014, Drafthouse Films acquired from Alpha Violet the distribution rights to The Tribe in the United States, with a planned 2015 theatrical release. Upon the acquisition, CEO of Drafthouse Films Tim League spoke highly of the piece and showered it with praise stating that he was witnessing "something truly special". Additionally he added, "Myroslav Slaboshpytskiy is a massive talent. I am confident that he will quickly become a world-renowned director, and I am excited and proud to be sharing his striking first feature with North America." At the news of the acquisition director Slaboshpytskiy stated, "I am very glad that my film will be released in the United States. I have always believed in the universality of film’s language, and have always believed that dialogue and subtitles change the way different audiences perceive the film in different countries." On 6 July 2014, it was confirmed that MCF MegaCom had bought the distribution right to ex-Yugoslavia territories, Art Fest had obtained the film rights to Bulgaria, and Film Europe Media Co had acquired the distribution rights to Czech Republic and Slovakia. The announcement that Bio Paradis had also acquired the right in Iceland marked the first time Alpha Violet has ever sold to the Icelandic territory directly. Alpha Violet was confirmed to be in negotiations for the United Kingdom, Scandinavian and Latin American territories to be collected.

On 28 October 2014, Metrodome Group had announced that it had picked up the United Kingdom rights for Slaboshpytskiy's film, with a planned 2015 release date. Giles Edwards, Head of Acquisitions at Metrodome, commented upon the acquisition, "Audacious, uncompromising and formally breathtaking, Miroslav Shlaboshpytskiy’s shattering masterpiece takes the chilling saturnalia of the feral crime film and transposes it into an unnerving, singularly unforgettable landscape.", himself concluding, "It heralds the arrival of the most astonishing new filmmaking talent in years."
 
Home media
Drafthouse Films has announced for plans to release The Tribe in select theatres across North America in 2015, as well as additionally on a variety of VOD platforms and digital, DVD, and Blu-ray formats. Additionally it was announced that the deal was negotiated by Alpha Violet's Virginie Devesa and Keiko Funato, and Drafthouse Films's James Emanuel Shapiro and Tim League.

Top ten lists
The film appeared on several critics' lists of the ten best films of 2014.

 

ReceptionThe Tribe received widespread critical acclaim by critics, audiences and at festivals all over the world. Film review aggregator Rotten Tomatoes reports that 88% of critics gave the film a "Certified Fresh" rating, based on 132 reviews with an average score of 7.66/10, with the consensus "A bleak, haunting drama whose wordless dialogue speaks volumes, The Tribe is a bold, innovative take on silent films for a contemporary audience." Metacritic, another review aggregator, assigned the film a weighted average score of 78 (out of 100) based on 27 reviews from mainstream critics, considered to be "generally favorable reviews."

Peter Bradshaw of The Guardian scored the piece four out of five stars, writing, "I can't stop thinking about it." while too praising  Slaboshpytskiy's ability to "[draw] on Samuel Beckett or Peter Brook to create a universal language of anxiety." while concluding the sentiment, "What an intriguing film." Leslie Felperin of The Hollywood Reporter praised the piece, stating, "The use of sign language, deafness and silence itself adds several heady new ingredients to the base material, alchemically creating something rich, strange and very original." He also admired the film's "silky smooth steadicam" cinematography of Vasyanovych. As well as comparing the language of gestures and body posture as "akin to watching a ballet like Coppélia or The Nutcracker".

Justin Chang of Variety heralded the film and its director, Myroslav Slaboshpytskiy, by stating: "Actions, emotions and desperate impulses speak far louder than words in The Tribe, a formally audacious coup de cinema that marks a stunning writing-directing debut for Ukrainian filmmaker [Slaboshpytskiy]." Chang was most praiseworthy of Vasyanovych's cinematography, Stepanskiy's sound design as "vividly detailed" and described Odudenko's production designs as "harshly lit corridors and graffiti-strewn exteriors". He also admired Novikova's "fire and vulnerability" as Anya.

Jonathan Romney of Film Comment granted the piece high acclaim, "[...] it was a thrill to discover something so bold, innovative, and downright wayward." Stating of the film, "[...] a magnificent example of long-take cinema". and calling it "an astonishing film". He continued by praising Slaboshpytskiy's risky endeavour, to which he "follows through with intrepidity and absolute rigor" as well as Vasyanovych's "precise compositions". Romney further adds, "The Tribe, in short, was the most surprising, most inventive, and in many ways most disturbing film I’ve seen in Cannes this year." He later named the film among the best movies of 2014.

Eric Kohn of indieWIRE gave the film an "A−" rating, adding, "While the specifics remain uncertain, it's never particularly difficult to keep up with the movie's pace, since their actions speak plainly enough -- and sometimes add far more expressiveness than any verbal exchanges could provide." Praising Slaboshpytskiy and Vasyanovych's usage of the steadicam approach, "capturing the actors' exchanges in their full-bodied entirety"; and Slaboshpytskiy as "brilliantly [developing] a suspenseful core through the mysteries of their conversations". He admired Grigory Fesenko's "body movements" and "precise details" through gestures.

Fred Topel wrote, in his review for CraveOnline, "The piece de resistance is a taboo subject that unfolds in an elaborate single take. It was so harrowing I would have applauded if it would not have been completely inappropriate for the subject matter to do so." Topel praised the cast as "made up of non actors but you wouldn’t suspect that" adding, "They are full of life and energy" 

Jessica Kiang of The Playlist gave the film an "A−" rating and wrote, "It might sound glib, but it's the literal truth: "The Tribe" left us speechless."Electric Sheep Magazine's Greg Klymkiw granted the film a maximum score of five stars, stating "A sad, shocking and undeniably harrowing dramatic reflection of Ukraine with the searing truthful lens of a stylistic documentary treatment (at times similar to that of Austrian auteur Ulrich Seidl)". He continues by commending that, "Visuals and actions are what drive the film and ultimately prove to be far more powerful than words ever could be." Luke Y. Thompson of Topless Robot spoke most highly of the film, declaring, "Compelling, upsetting, brutal and brilliant, The Tribe is one of the best works of cinema of the year - a familiar template recreated in what, for most, will be an entirely new world." Too adding, "[...] this is a movie that will and should be used in cinema schools as a master class in how film is a visual medium."

Accolades

See also

List of films featuring the deaf and hard of hearing
List of the 100 best films in the history of Ukrainian cinema

References

 Sources 

 De Clercq, Eva. (2019). Disability @ the Movies: Toward a Disability-Conscious Bioethics. In E. Mihailov, T. Wangmo, V. Federiuc, & B. Elger (Eds.), Contemporary Debates in Bioethics: European Perspectives (pp. 97–107). De Gruyter Open Poland. https://doi.org/10.2478/9783110571219-010
 Kenny, Oliver. (2020). Beyond Critical Partisanship: Ethical Witnessing and Long Takes of Sexual Violence. Studies in European Cinema, 19(2), 164–178. https://doi.org/10.1080/17411548.2020.1778846
 Shaw, Claire. (2015). Myroslav Slaboshpytskiy: The Tribe (Plemya, 2014). KinoKultura, 48''. http://www.kinokultura.com/2015/48r-plemya-CS.shtml

External links

 
 
 
 
 
 Interview with Yana Novikova about her role in The Tribe
 Rolling Stone article

2014 films
2014 drama films
2014 directorial debut films
2010s feminist films
Films about deaf people
Films about special education
Films about child prostitution
Films about rape
Juvenile sexuality in films
Films set in Ukraine
Films shot in Ukraine
2014 independent films
Ukrainian Sign Language films
Ukrainian teen films
European Film Awards winners (films)
Films about abortion
2010s gang films
Prostitution in Ukraine
Ukrainian drama films